Chrysonasma is a genus of moths in the family Lecithoceridae.

Species
Chrysonasma cassiterota (Meyrick, 1923)
Chrysonasma caliginosa Park and Byun, 2008

Etymology
The generic name is derived from Greek chrysos (meaning gold) and nasmos (meaning stream).

References

Torodorinae
Moth genera